Trælnes Chapel is a chapel of the Church of Norway in Brønnøy Municipality in Nordland county, Norway. It is located just north of the village of Trælnes. It is an annex chapel in the Brønnøy parish which is part of the Sør-Helgeland prosti (deanery) in the Diocese of Sør-Hålogaland. The wooden chapel was built in a long church style in 1980.

See also
List of churches in Sør-Hålogaland

References

Brønnøy
Churches in Nordland
Wooden churches in Norway
20th-century Church of Norway church buildings
Churches completed in 1980
1980 establishments in Norway
Long churches in Norway